Quicksand is loose, water-logged sand which yields easily to weight or pressure.

Quicksand or Quicksands may also refer to:

 Dry quicksand, loose sand which yields easily to weight or pressure

Places
 Quicksand, Kentucky, a town in the United States

Arts, entertainment, and media

Films
 Quicksands (1913 film), directed by Allan Dwan
 The Quicksands, a 1914 film starring Lillian Gish
 Quicksand (1918 film), starring Henry A. Barrows
 Quicksands (1923 film)
 Quicksand (1950 film), starring Mickey Rooney and Peter Lorre
 Quicksand (2002 film), starring Michael Dudikoff
 Quicksand (2003 film), starring Michael Caine and Michael Keaton

Literature
 Quicksand (Larsen novel), a 1928 novel by Nella Larsen
 Quicksand (Tanizaki novel), a 1928 novel by Junichiro Tanizaki
 Quicksand, a 1967 novel by John Brunner
 Quicksand, a 2015 novel by Steve Toltz
 Quicksand (Persson Giolito novel), a 2016 novel by Malin Persson Giolito

Music
 Quicksand (American band), a post-hardcore band formed in 1990
 Quicksand (Welsh band) a band that released an album on Dawn Records in 1973

Albums
 Quicksands (album), a 1990 album by Karel Kryl
 Quicksand (Noah23 album), a 2002 album by Noah23
 Quicksand (Ted Curson album), a 1976 album by jazz trumpeter Ted Curson
 Störst av allt (album), by Carola Häggkvist

Songs
 "Quicksand" (Caro Emerald song), 2015
 "Quicksand" (David Bowie song), 1971
 "Quicksand" (La Roux song), 2008
 "Quicksand" (Martha and the Vandellas song), 1963
 "Quicksand" (Morray song), 2020
 "Quicksand" (Tom Chaplin song), 2016
 "Quicksand", 2015 song by Björk from Vulnicura
 "Quicksand", 2012 song by Bridget Mendler from Hello My Name Is...
 "Quicksand", 2008 song by Britney Spears from Circus
 "Quicksand", 2009 song by Keri Hilson from In a Perfect World...
 "Quicksand", 1999 song by Lit from A Place in the Sun
 "Quicksand", 1996 song by Silkworm from Firewater
 "Quicksand", 2011 song by The Story So Far from Under Soil and Dirt
 "Quicksand", 2017 song by Tech N9ne from Strange Reign

Other art, entertainment, and media
 Quicksand (board game), a 1989 Parker Brothers board game
 Quicksand (comics), a Marvel Comics supervillain

Television
 "Quicksand", a 1956 episode of Cheyenne
 Quicksand (TV series), a Swedish crime drama based on the book of the same name by Malin Persson Giolito

See also 
 
 
Quicklund